An infant school is a term used primarily in England and Wales, for the education of children between the ages of four and seven years. It is usually a small school serving a particular area. It is sometimes a department in a larger primary school educating children up to the age of approximately eleven years old.

An infant school forms part of local education provision giving primary education. In England and Wales, children start at infant school between the ages of four and five in a Reception class. They sometimes attend part-time (mornings only or afternoons only) for the first term.

In England, reception is considered part of early years education whilst the following two years are known as Key Stage 1. In Wales, the entirety of nursery and infant school is included in the foundation phase.

Infants is followed by Junior School known formally in both England and Wales as Key Stage 2.

History

The first infant school in England was at Brewers Green, Westminster in 1818 which was placed under the charge of James Buchanan, a weaver. Buchanan had served at what is considered the first infant school in Great Britain,  Robert Owen's at New Lanark. The second in England was opened in 1820 by Joseph Wilson in Spitalfields and placed in the charge of Samuel Wilderspin. In 1823, Wilderspin published On the Importance of Educating the Infant Children of the Poor. In June 1824, Henry Brougham, William Wilberforce, Samuel Wilderspin and William Allen formed the Infant School Society. The purpose of the society was to train teachers and to promote infant school formation.

Unlike Owen's school, those opened under Wilderspin's influence placed great emphasis on religious training for the young children of the poor. Dame schools, which had existed long before, had shown the need for childcare of very young children for women who worked outside the home. The new infant schools were to provide a safe environment for these children as well as give them some educational advantages. Wilderspin's schools were based on the reform education theory of Swiss thinker Johann Heinrich Pestalozzi. James Pierrepont Greaves, secretary of the Infant School Society, worked with Pestalozzi for several years, as did Charles Mayo, who along with his sister Elizabeth Mayo, worked with the Home and Colonial Institution (later the Home and Colonial Infant School Society) to set up infant schools and train teachers.

As a state school system was established in England and Wales from 1870 onwards, infant schools were incorporated into the system. The government set standards for pupils attainment in order to prepare them for the next stage of their schooling but from as early as 1893 infant schools were being encouraged to educate children in way that was suited to their development and by the interwar period they adopted a child centred approach. Later, following a 1967 report on primary education teachers were given more freedom to teach as they wished until the 1988 education reform act introduced a more specific subject based curriculum and mandatory testing.

Infant and junior schools were often separate schools, but from the 1970s through the 1990s, many infant and junior departments were merged into single primary schools, as both an infants school and junior school gives primary education. The 1970s and 1980s saw hundreds of infant schools in Britain abolished in favour of first (primary) schools, but some were reverted into infant schools by the early-1990s. Since 2000, there have been several changes back and forth between infant and junior schools, and the combined primary school model. By the 2010s, there was no single way in which schools are structured, and the academy school education model had been introduced. In 2016, the UK Government expressed an intention for all primary schools in England (combined infants and juniors) to become academy schools, and this plan is facing some criticism.

The introduction of the School Standards and Framework Act 1998  meant that classes in infant schools in England and Wales are limited to no more than 30 children per school teacher.

See also
Education in the United Kingdom

Notes

References

Educational stages
School terminology
Education in England
School types
Education in Wales
Primary education
Early childhood education in the United Kingdom